The history of autism spans over a century, autism has been subject to varying treatments, being pathologized or being viewed as a beneficial part of human neurodiversity. The understanding of autism has been shaped by cultural, scientific, and societal factors throughout history, and its perception and treatment change over time as scientific understanding of autism develops.

Before autism 
A few examples of autistic symptoms and treatments were described long before autism was named. The Table Talk of Martin Luther, compiled by his notetaker, Mathesius, contains the story of a 12-year-old boy who may have been severely autistic. The earliest well-documented case of autism is that of Hugh Blair of Borgue, as detailed in a 1747 court case in which his brother successfully petitioned to annul Blair's marriage to gain Blair's inheritance.

The Wild Boy of Aveyron, a feral child found in 1798, showed several signs of autism. He was non-verbal during his teenage years, and his case was widely popular among society for its time. Such cases brought awareness to autism, and more research was conducted on the natural dimensions of human behavior. The medical student Jean Itard treated him with a behavioral program designed to help him form social attachments and to induce speech via imitation.

In 1877, British doctor John Down used the term developmental retardation to describe conditions including what would be considered autism today.

Also in 1877, German doctor Adolf Kussmaul defined the condition aphasia voluntaria - when people choose not to speak.

German psychiatrist Hermann Emminghaus wrote Allgemeine Psychopathologie zur Einführung in das Studium der Geistesstörungen (General Psychopathology as an Introduction to the Study of Mental Disorders) in 1878. Using a very similar typology he later wrote the first textbook on child psychiatry, Die psychischen Störungen des Kindesalters (The Psychic Disturbances of Childhood) in 1887. These were both very influential on the categorisation of mental conditions. While autistic people could fit into certain categories, there was no category that aligned closely with autism.

The term dementia praecox (premature dementia) was first used by German psychiatrist Heinrich Schüle in 1880, and also by 1891 by Arnold Pick, a Czech professor of psychiatry at Charles University in Prague. The term was greatly popularised in 1899 through the sixth edition of German Psychiatrist Emil Kraepelin's book Psychiatrie. Ein Lehrbuch für Studirende und Aerzte (Psychiatry. A text-book for students and physicians). This condition was defined very broadly by today's standards. The primary disturbance in dementia praecox was seen to be a disruption in cognitive or mental functioning in attention, memory, and goal-directed behaviour. Autistic people seen to have these attributes were diagnosed with this condition.

In 1887, John Down gave a lecture which describes idiots savants, people whose mental abilities were generally poor, but which had strong abilities in a particular area. He notes that "In none of the cases of "idiot savant" have I been able to trace any history of a like faculty in the parents or in the brothers and sisters …"

Italian psychiatrist Sante de Sanctis briefly mentioned a condition in a 1906 paper he called dementia praecocissima (very premature dementia), which was a form of dementia praecox that started very early in people's lives. He wrote about it in more detail in a 1908 paper. It was a very broadly defined condition he considered "very similar to the hebephrenic or catatonic symptom complex of puberty and adolescence."

Austrian educator Theodor Heller defined a condition called dementia infatilis (infantile dementia) in 1908. This condition would go on to be called Heller's syndrome and childhood disintegrative disorder. The DSM currently considers it part of autism spectrum disorder. It is a rare genetic condition.

Eugen Bleuler and contemporaries (1908–1911)

Schizophrenia 
Eugen Bleuler was a Swiss psychiatrist who was the director of the Burghölzli mental hospital, which was associated with the University of Zurich.

In April 1908 he gave a lecture explaining that dementia praecox was very different to other forms of dementia. He proposed that it be given the unique name schizophrenia - a split mind. The term would be increasingly adopted over the next fifty years.

The much more narrowly defined condition called "schizophrenia" today very nearly always starts in someone's adolescence or adulthood. Thus childhood schizophrenia has always been something else.

Pre-cursors to schizoid 

In two papers first publicly presented in November 1908 and May 1910, and published in 1909 and 1910 respectively, Swiss-American psychiatrist August Hoch of the New York State Psychiatric Institute defined the concept of the shut-in personality. It was characterised by reticence, seclusiveness, shyness and a preference for living in fantasy worlds, among other things. Hoch also said they had "a poorly balanced sexual instinct [and] strikingly fruitless love affairs". This personality was identified because a high proportion of patients with dementia praecox had shut-in behaviour before more serious symptoms appeared.

In September 1909, Swiss psychiatrist Carl Jung used the term introverted in a lecture at Clark University. A transcript of this lecture was then published with two others in a journal in 1910, the first time the term appeared in print. In the lecture he mentions that love that is "introverted", "is turned inward into the subject and there produces increased imaginative activity". Jung had earlier worked under Bleuler at Burghölzli.

Autism 
The New Latin word autismus (English translation autism) was coined by Blueuler in July 1910. He first used it in print to describe a symptom of schizophrenia in the scientific paper Zur Theorie des schizophrenen Negativismus (On the theory of schizophrenic negativism).

As to why he created the term, (and giving the first explanation of its meaning), Bleuler wrote:By "autismus" I mean about the same as Freud (but not Havelock Ellis) by "autoerotismus". But I think it is good to avoid the latter expression, as it is misunderstood by anyone not familiar with Freud's writings. I have discussed the concept of it in more detail in the chapter on schizophrenia in the forthcoming Aschaffenbürg Handbooks of Psychiatry.Bleuler later adds:It goes without saying that autism is not only expressed in a centripetal relationship to the outside world. The patient who wants to shut himself off from reality must not only let his surroundings affect him as little as possible, he must also not want to actively influence it. For two reasons; he would be distracted from his inner being and forced to pay attention to the outside world in order to be able to influence it; but he would also create new sensory stimuli and other connections with reality through the action itself.In the earlier mentioned 1911 edition of the Handbook of Psychiatry edited by Gustav Aschaffenburg, Bleuler explains what his new term autism means:The most severe schizophrenics, who no longer have any intercourse at all, live in a world of their own; they have cocooned themselves with their desires, which they consider fulfilled, or with the sufferings of their pursuit, and limit contact with the outside world as much as possible.

This detachment from reality together with the relative and absolute preponderance of inner life is what we call autism ...

The name autism says essentially on the positive side what P. Janet negatively describes as "perte du sens de la réalité" [loss of sense of reality]. But we cannot readily accept the latter expression, because it covers the symptom far too generally. The sens de la réalité is not entirely lacking in the schizophrenic, he only fails for those things that have come into conflict with his complexes. Our relatively severe institutional patients are, for the most part, very good at such institutional events that are irrelevant to their complexes. You can get detailed anamneses [patient accounts of their medical history] from them, which are confirmed, etc. In short, they show every day that they have not lost their grasp of reality, but that this ability is only inhibited and lost in certain contexts ...

The behavior of many shows at first nothing remarkable; only after a longer period of observation does one see how much they are always looking for their own way and how little they let their surroundings get to them. Even severely ill chronic patients often have a very good connection with their surroundings in normal everyday life; they chat, take part in games, often seek out stimuli - but they choose; they have their complexes to themselves; they never say a word about it and don't want to be touched from the outside ...

Wishes and fears form the content of autistic thinking; Wishes alone in the not very frequent cases where the contradiction with reality is not felt; Fears when the obstacles opposed to the desires are felt. Even where no actual delusions arise, autism is demonstrable in the patient's inability to deal with reality, in their inappropriate reaction to external influences (irritability) and in their lack of resistance to any ideas and ideas shoots.

Just as autistic feeling is turned away from reality, so autistic thinking has its own special laws: autism, of course, uses the usual logical connections as far as it suits it; but is by no means tied to it. It is directed by affective needs. Alongside this, he thinks in symbols, in analogies, in incomplete concepts, in accidental connections. If the same patient turns to reality, he may be able to think sharply and logically again. So we have to distinguish between realistic and autistic thinking, side by side in the same patient. In realistic thinking the patient orients himself quite well in the time and space of reality; he directs his actions accordingly, insofar as they appear normal to us. Delusions, gross violations of logic and decency and similar pathological symptoms arise from autistic thinking. The two forms are often quite well separated, so that the patient can now think completely autistic and now completely normally; in other cases they mix to the point of complete interpenetration.He repeated this entry (with slight modification), and added more material in his 1911 book Dementia praecox, oder, Gruppe der Schizophrenien (Dementia praecox, or, the group of schizophrenias).

He included:When schizophrenics have to associate with other people, it often happens in a very strange way. Soon they are obtrusive, cannot bring themselves to keep saying the same thing, are completely deaf to all objections; soon they behave dismissively, briefly, rudely …

Autism in itself cannot be used for diagnosis, since it occurs notably in hysterical dream states, but only in a certain way, e.g. in the controlled delusions of paralysis. In the non-schizophrenic cases the symptom looks different, but it is difficult to describe the differences. The epileptic and organic simply withdraw into themselves when they adopt behavior resembling autism, while the schizophrenic find themselves in opposition and at odds with reality. Also, in the non-schizophrenics, the barrier to the outside world is much less complete; under certain circumstances they may not actively concern themselves with reality, but they immediately come to terms with it if they are e.g. they address it …

Only in the sexual area is it possible to fulfill one's wishes to some extent with autism; for the patient, the imaginary lover is more than a real one, which is why normal intercourse is relatively rarely sought, and that is why the sexual life of even those who are not quite advanced moves almost entirely in the field of onanistic gratification …

In a similar way, certain inclinations, ways of life, and "passions" are accused of producing the disease. One is said to have become ill because he took up the exciting profession of an actor, the other because he lived so irregularly and has always changed careers, the third because he is passionate about travel. If you look closely, you will not find the slightest reason for such a suspicion. Schizophrenics pay less attention to reality, for better or worse, because of their autism they become more independent in thinking and acting; they are much more inclined to carry out an idea than others who are prevented from doing so by good and bad considerations, herd spirit, suggestibility towards the way of thinking of the majority, and generally greater adaptability to the situation as it is. All new movements attract the latent schizophrenics first and are promoted and endangered by them at the same time. This is how it is clear that several of the "Stürmern und Drängern" [members of an emotional art movement] "became ill", but not because participation in the movement had made them ill.

An etiological significance of dissatisfaction with life cannot be dismissed under all circumstances. It is probable that such psychic stimuli can make the disease manifest. Usually, however, it is also the case there that people are never satisfied with their profession and their position because they are ill …

If the forms of our logic only repeat associations given by experience or draw analogies to them, it is self-evident that the acquired logical associations are damaged before the innate affective ones in a general mental disorder. If there is a schizophrenic disposition in the psyche, it should be borne in mind that individuals whose ability to reproduce reality and whose connections are poorly developed must be predisposed to autism …

But where the patients have completely developed into their autism, the outside world only has a reality value insofar as it disturbs their thoughts; if an affect then accompanies external events, it can only be that of "rejection". From their point of view, the apparently parathmic self-satisfaction of many schizophrenics is not abnormal at all, since their wishes are fulfilled in autistic thinking …

A direct consequence of the schizophrenic split in the psyche is autism; the healthy person has the tendency in logical operations to draw on all the pertinent material without regard to its affective value. In the schizophrenic loosening of logic, on the other hand, there is an exclusion of all associations that resist an emotional complex. The need, which no human being lacks, to seek a substitute for insufficient reality in the imagination can be satisfied without resistance in this way. However much the products of the imagination may contradict reality, they do not come into conflict with it in the patient's brain; they are brought into contact with her only to the extent that they can be reconciled with the patient's affective needs. In the severe cases, all of reality with its never-ending sensory stimulation is shut off; it only exists in banal contexts, when eating, when dressing …

Autism has always attracted attention, particularly among the French. There are examples: one side of it is emphasized under the names of autophilia, egocentrism, hypertrophy of the ego, augmentation du sens de la personalite [increased sense of self], while the negative side is called "perte du sens de la realite" [loss of sense of reality] or described as "perte de la fonction du reel" [loss of the function of reality]. Pelletier says that the patient no longer distinguishes between reality and fantasies; "supposer la croyance ä leur realite chez ces malades serait doter leurs etats de conscience d'une energie qu'ils n'ont pas." [to assume belief in their reality, these patients would endow their states of consciousness with an energy that they do not have.] There is something valid about all these views, but in our opinion they do not get to the heart of the phenomenon.

Autism is also the exaggeration of a physiological phenomenon. There is a normal autistic thinking, which does not need to take reality into account and is determined in its direction by affects. The child plays with a piece of wood, which sometimes means a baby, sometimes a house. But even without a substratum, most people imagine a fairy tale in which their wishes or fears are fulfilled (in the case of hysterics, this fantasy can be exaggerated to pathological levels; cf. Pick, 570, a). A large part of the fantasy literature, the fairy tales and sagas arise from this way of thinking …

[In some cases] The patient renders reality harmless by not letting it reach him (autism); he ignores her, splits her off, flees into his thoughts. For these patients, autism has the same meaning as the monastery walls for the monks, the desert for some saints, the study room for some types of scholars. The difference between sick and healthy is only a quantitative one here …

Quite apart from the anatomical findings, which do not correspond to the severe symptoms, some things are not unfavorable to the assumption of a psychic genesis of the disease. Aggravations and improvements are often psychological. In the antecedents of the schizophrenic there is usually an introverted disposition, from which autism and, indirectly, most other symptoms could be explained …

The strict and completely unrelenting implementation of the house rules in this respect had the result that within a few days they all gave up their resistance, and with the majority also that they became more accessible altogether. If it can cure a patient of his suicidal instinct if he is allowed to do so, it can also have the same effect if the patient sees the absolute impossibility of following the instinct. Many loathsome bad habits can be got rid of by not tolerating them.

The general tasks of the treatment are education and establishing contact with reality, that is, fighting the autism.

Bleuler believed that the idiosyncratic behaviours of schizophrenics displaying autistic behaviour were due to them engaging with personal fantasy rather than with the world as it is. He believed they drew on an early childhood mental state that was unable to form theory of mind.

It is not entirely clear what features of the "schizophrenics" Bleuler referred to belonged to what we consider schizophrenia today, and what proportion were caused by what we consider autism.

1913-1924 

In 1913, the Mental Deficiency Act was passed in England and Wales, ensuring institutional care for all children identified as "mental defectives".

Both Russian psychiatrist Pyotr Gannushkin's 1914 paper The state of the question of the schizophrenic constitution, and the verschrobene (eccentric) type of the eighth edition of Emil Kraepelin's psychiatry textbook (1915), detailed character types that would later be considered schizoid by Grunya Sukhareva.

Kraepelin notes:A small group of psychopaths, whose clinical interpretation and delimitation is still quite doubtful, form the eccentrics. They are characterized by the lack of inner unity and consistency in their mental life. The intellectual endowment is usually moderate, sometimes quite good. The patients are often absent-minded, forgetful, and show fluctuations in their intellectual capacity; "The brain goes on strike from time to time". Individuals have artistic interests and concern themselves with inventions; one patient said he was suffering from "inventor's disease". The judgment becomes crooked and one-sided through the overgrowth of individual schools of thought and the failure of other schools of thought; the patients tend to exaggerate and be extravagant in their views of life, and have a preference for extravagant and unworldly ideas. They are often quick-witted, eloquent, and write long and voluminous documents. Their mode of expression is often bombastic, screwed up, the content of their speeches and presentations rambling, jumpy, confused, full of meaningless idioms. Some patients show a certain slyness and shrewdness, pretend, come up with all sorts of excuses, and know how to justify their unusual actions in a more or less plausible way. Here and there we encounter hints of delusional trains of thought. The sick feel called to higher things and are not given enough attention; one looks at them strangely on the street; there is agitation against them; the woman wants to poison them. Sometimes they have a certain feeling of illness; a sick person repeatedly came to the clinic to be examined to see if he was "silly" …

They don't adjust to other people's experiences, but try to go their own way, occupy themselves with completely hopeless and out-of-the-way plans. Because they are in the habit of attacking things in an inexpedient, peculiar way, they have no luck anywhere, they get nowhere …

The crankiness of the patient is most obvious in their relations with the opposite sex. Some patients refuse them at all from the outset. But for most of them, more or less difficult struggles result from them, since they are completely incapable of fitting into a reasonable coexistence …

The group here tentatively delimited comprises only a small number of cases. While there are plenty of quirky personalities; however, most of them turn out to be precursors, mild cases, or final stages of dementia praecox …

Since the eccentrics, even if they often suffer shipwreck in life, usually do not commit any serious anti-social acts, they usually only occasionally and temporarily end up in the hands of the psychiatrist …The term schizoid began to be used just before 1920. It was used to describe people who had symptoms similar to "schizophrenia", but were not as pronounced.

1921 saw the publication of two influential works that repeated and expanded the patterns found in earlier schizoid types.

Carl Jung's 1921 book Psychologische Typen was published as Personality Types in English in 1923. It described the "introverted" in detail for the first time.

German psychiatrist of the University of Tübingen, Ernst Kretschmer's 1921 paper Körperbau und Charakter was expanded in 1922. This expanded version was published as the book Physique and Character in English in 1925, and used the term schizoid.

In 1924, Bleuler said schizoid people were: shut-in, suspicious, incapable of discussion, people who are comfortably dull and at the same time sensitive, people who in a narrow manner pursue vague purposes, improvers of the universe, etc.At this time Bleuler also believed that everyone had a schizoid element, writing "Every man then has one syntonic [in harmony with one's environment] and one schizoid component, and through closer observation one can determine its force and direction".

Also in 1924, Austrian-Swiss psychiatrist Moritz Tramer published the paper Einseitig Talentierte und Begabte Schwachsinnige (Singularly talented and gifted mental defectives). It described autistic children. Leo Kanner would later claim Tramer's autism work as an antecedent of his own.

In 1925, Sante de Sanctis published another paper about "dementia praecocissima". It had some overlap with Heller's syndrome.

Grunya Sukhareva (1925-1926) 

Soviet child psychiatrist Grunya Sukhareva (Груня Сухарева) was the first person to comprehensively define what is now considered autism.

Sukhareva was born in Kyiv to a Jewish family. Between 1917 and 1921, she worked in a psychiatric hospital in Kyiv. In 1921, she founded a school for children with psychological problems at the Psychoneurological Department for Children in Moscow, and worked there for some time.

In 1925 she published a paper in Russian containing six case studies and a detailed description of schizoid personality disorder in children, titled Шизоидныепсиxопатиив детскомвозрасте (Schizoid Psychopathies in Childhood). This was republished in German in 1926, as Die schizoiden Psychopathien im Kindesalter (The Schizoid Psychopathies in Childhood). Her definition aligned well with that for ASD in the DSM-5.

Her description of the condition included the following (as translated by Sula Wolff in 1996):I. An odd type of thinking

a) a tendency towards abstraction and schematization (the introduction of concrete concepts does not improve, but rather impedes thought processes);

b) this characteristic of thinking is often combined with a tendency to rationalization and absurd rumination (see cases 1, 2, 3, 4, 5). This last feature often marks the personality out as odd.

II. An autistic attitude

All affected children keep themselves apart from their peers, find it hard to adapt to and are never fully themselves among other children. Cases 1, 2 and 3 became objects of general ridicule for the other children after their admission to our school. Cases 4 and 5 carried no weight among their peers and were nick-named "talking machine", although their level of overall functioning was far above that of the other children. Case 6 himself avoids the company of children because he finds it painful. All these children manifest a tendency towards solitude and avoidance of other people from early childhood onwards; they keep themselves apart, avoid communal games and prefer fantastic stories and fairy tales.

III. Emotional life

There is a certain flatness and superficiality of emotions (cases 2, 3, 5). The latter is often combined with what Kretschmer has aptly called the Psychasthetic aspect of mood. This mixture of insensitive and oversensitive elements was seen in all our cases. Case 1 had affective sluggishness as well as exaggerated sensitivity; case 2 demonstrated increased irritability resulting in explosive emotional outbursts, combined with affective sluggishness, in line with Bleuler's description of spasms and paralysis of emotions. Case 5 had a generally calm mood state and was at the same time passionately tender towards some of the people close to him. Case 4 was a gloomy, irritable misanthrope but also a tenderly loving son.

Other characteristics were as follows:

a) a tendency towards automatism (cases 1, 2, 3, 4 and 6) manifesting as sticking to tasks which had been started and as psychic inflexibility with difficulty in adaptation to novelty;

b) impulsive, odd behaviour (cases 1, 2, 3);

c) clowning, with a tendency to rhyming and stereotypic neologisms (cases 1, 2, 3, 5);

d) a tendency to obsessive compulsive behaviour (cases 1, 2, 3, 5); and

e) heightened suggestibility (cases 1, 3 and 6).

We did not observe any definite negativism. Apparently unmotivated obstinacy was seen in two cases (5 and 6).

Definite motor impairments were found in all our cases: clumsiness, awkwardness, abruptness of movements, many superfluous movements and synkinesias (cases 1, 2, 3 and 4).

Lack of facial expressiveness and of expressive movements (manneristic (cases 1, 4 and 5)); decreased postural tone (cases 2, 4 and 6); oddities and lack of modulation of speech (cases 1, 2 and 3)Regarding the cause of this condition, Sukhareva noted:In most of our cases environmental causes could be excluded on the basis of a detailed case history: pathogenic factors such as brain pathology, intoxication, or a poor child rearing environment were absent. Furthermore, the symptoms had been persistently present since early childhood ...

Our observations force us to conclude that there is a group of personality disorders whose clinical picture shares certain features with schizophrenia, but which yet differs profoundly from schizophrenia in terms of its pathogenesis. At present we can only speculate about the possible biological/pathogenetic substrate of this disorder. The explanation that best fits the clinical phenomena is that schizoid personality disorder arises on the basis of an inborn deficiency of those systems which are also affected in schizophrenia (but that in the latter condition other, additional, influences are at play).Sukhareva followed this paper with one the next year that focused on girls with the condition. She found that there were four main sex-related differences. (Charlotte Simmonds translated this paper into English in 2020.)

She was supervised by Mikhail Gurevich, who had previously worked under Emil Kraepelin.

While Sukhareva's writings would be read and referenced by American child psychology researchers like Louise Despert, Charles Bradley, and Leo Kanner in the 1930s and 40s, her work was subsequently largely unknown in the Anglosphere and Western Europe.

1929-1936 
In 1929, German psychiatrist Erich Rudolf Jaensch (of the University of Marburg) published his book Grundformen menschlichen Seins (Basic forms of human existence). Hans Asperger would later say his autism thinking was influenced by it explanation of schizothyms (a schizoid personality type).

In 1930, Sukhareva published the paper K probleme struktury i dinamiki detskikh konstitutsionnykh psikhopatiĭ (shizoidnye formy) (On the problem of the structure and dynamics of children’s constitutional psychopathy (schizoid form)). It was translated into English by William New and Hristo Kyuchukov in 2022. She notes:Therefore, through the analysis of the schizoid psychopathies we can distinguish the primary general psychic symptoms in a sophisticated psychopathological picture. These symptoms can be delineated as follows:

 Psychomotor disorders—awkwardness of motion, a kind [of] bipolarity between excitation and lethargy, with automatism and stereotypy;
 Frustration and disorder of affect and emotional responses, expressed in fragile attachments to others, and a lack of unified emotional experience;
 Features of associative work and thinking, that is, bizarre associations, inclination to the abstract, automatism of thinking, inflexibility…

In our data, the pathological development of the personality proceeded in two directions. First, when the main features of the schizoid psyche are exacerbated by an unfavorable environment, the schizoid becomes slower and more distracted, more withdrawn and autistic, etc. Second, new symptoms, not typical of any constitutional type, suddenly appear. Among the new symptoms are rudeness, exasperation, cruelty, and suspicion. The schizoid psychopaths who live in very difficult conditions shift in their affect toward the unfeeling, and present themselves as cold, rude, and stubborn …

It is necessary to distinguish two types of symptoms in the picture of the schizoid psychopathies: The main primary symptoms which represent the direct mental manifestations of biological insufficiency, and secondary symptoms in the form of various reactive states and characterological shifts, which are the result of a complex interaction of endogenous and exogenous factors.In May 1931, young Austrian psychiatrist Hans Asperger joined the Vienna University's Children's Clinic. In 1932 he joined it's department of curative education. He learnt from those already working there, including the Austrians psychiatrist George Frankl, psychologist Anni Weiss, and nurse Viktorine Zak.

In December 1932, Sukhareva published Uber den Verlauf der Schizophrenien im Kindesalter (On the course of schizophrenia in childhood).  It notes:The lack of unification of the psychic functions characteristic of the schizophrenic process is one of the earliest symptoms in our children. Even the psychiatric untrained educator these children seem striking and odd. What is striking about them is the unexpected and unpredictable absurdity of their actions, theirs affectless impulsiveness, their unmotivated obstinacy …

The premorbid features of these children (in cases where such features are at all possible, i.e., in cases with determinable onset) present a rather distinctive picture. From early childhood on, such children showed a lack of adaptability to life in the collective, a certain autism and unreliability.

In 8 cases increased sensitivity was reported, in 5 cases emotional coldness; in the remaining cases the emotional habitus was predominantly indifferent and torpid. Reports of inadequacies in motor skills are strikingly frequent: tardiness, poor mobility, clumsiness ("eats very slowly", "has no interest in physical exercises", "learned to help himself very late", etc.), this type was noted in 75% of all cases. In terms of intellectual development, we had marked retardation in 5 cases, early development in 3 cases, and normal range in the remaining cases.In May 1933, American psychiatrist Howard Potter, (assistant director of the New York State Psychiatric Institute and Hospital), published a paper titled Schizophrenia in Children. Potter defined six diagnostic criteria for childhood schizophrenia, which Leo Kanner would later see as being important when thinking about autism:

 A generalized retraction of interests from the environment.
 Dereistic thinking, feeling and acting.
 Disturbances of thought, manifested through blocking, symbolization, condensation, perseveration, incoherence and diminution, sometimes to the extent of mutism.
 Defect in emotional rapport.
 Diminution, rigidity and distortion of affect.
 Alterations of behavior with either an increase of motility, leading to incessant activity, or a diminution of motility, reacting to complete immobility or bizarre behavior with a tendency to perseveration or stereotypy.

In 1933, Sukhareva published the paper Особенности течения шизофрении в детском возрасте (Particularities in the course of schizophrenia in childhood). (It had been presented to a conference in June 1932).

In 1934, Soviet psychiatrist Evgenia Grebelskaya-Albatz (Евгения Гребельская-Альбац) of Moscow published the paper Zur Klinik der Schizophrenie des frühen Kindesalters (On the clinic of early childhood schizophrenia). It divided people with childhood "schizophrenia" into two groups, those with normal intelligence, and those with lesser intelligence.

Also in 1934, George Frankl published the paper Befehlen und Gehorchen (Command and Obey). It identified a group of children with particular language difficulties that some have subsequently considered autistic.

Additionally in 1934, Moritz Tramer published the paper Elktiver Mutismus bei Kindern (Elective Mutism in Children), coining the term elective mutism.

In 1935 and 1936, Sukhareva published at least five papers in Russian about childhood schizophrenia.

In April 1935, Anni Weiss published the paper Qualitative intelligence testing as a means of diagnosis in the examination of psychopathic children, which includes a case study about an autistic boy. In August that year, the Jewish Weiss migrated from Europe to the United States. She would go on to work at Johns Hopkins Hospital in Baltimore.

In 1935, Asperger became the head of the Vienna University's Children's Clinic's department of curative education.

During this period, the term autism came to be used quite widely, with a variety of related meanings.

Asperger, Kanner and contemporaries (1937-1949)

1937-September 1938 
In 1937, Austrian psychiatrist Hans Asperger remained the head of the Vienna University's Children's Clinic's department of curative education.

Austrian-American psychiatrist Leo Kanner was an associate professor of psychiatry at Johns Hopkins Hospital in Baltimore. Kanner was America's pre-eminent child psychiatrist. He had published the first American textbook on the topic in 1935. (While many sources say he published the first English-language book of that kind, Kanner himself credits this to William Ireland).

One of the psychiatrists working for Asperger was George Frankl. Frankl was working at the clinic long before Asperger, and had taught Asperger much about child psychiatry. As a Jew, Frankl was in danger from his country's Nazi regime. So he left Vienna in 1937 and migrated to the United States in November that year. He went to work with his friend Kanner in Baltimore.

In 1937, Swiss psychiatrist Jakob Lutz of the University of Zurich published a short book reviewing the available material on childhood schizophrenia, including the work of Sukhareva, Potter, Grebelskaja-Albatz and others. It was republished in a journal in 1938. Lutz visited Kanner's department at Johns Hopkins in early 1938. Kanner would later claim Lutz's autism work as an antecedent of his own.

In December 1937, British psychiatrist Mildred Creak of Maudsley Hospital presented a paper titled "Psychoses in Children". One part of it identified a group of five children that might today be considered autistic. The paper was published in March 1938.

In June 1938, American psychiatrist Louise Despert of the New York State Psychiatric Institute published the paper "Schizophrenia in Children". It identified case studies of people that have subsequently been identified as having autism. The paper referenced two researchers, Sukhareva and Grebelskaya-Albatz. It has been suggested that this paper was a major influence on Kanner. Kanner would later claim Despert's autism work as an antecedent of his own.

October 1938 

Hans Asperger used the terms autistic psychopath and autism in a 3 October 1938 lecture to describe a pattern he had seen in his patients and elsewhere. The lecture was published later that year as Das Psychisch Abnormale Kind (The Mentally Abnormal Child). The lecture included two case studies, and analysis. It instructed its predominantly Viennese listeners and readers that people who are a bit strange may also be very intelligent, and that knowing this will become important "when the 'Law for the Prevention of Hereditary Diseased Offspring' comes into force in our country".

Describing a particular kind of mentally abnormal child, Asperger wrote:All abnormal symptoms can be derived from the disturbance of the instinctive functions: the disturbance of the understanding of the situation and the disturbance of relationships with other people; from this we understand the lack of respect for authority, the lack of disciplinary understanding at all; but we also understand the fact that nobody really likes these people, we understand the heartless wickedness.

Equivalent to this lack of instinct is not only the clumsiness in pure motor skills; but also the poor practical understanding, the success of practice that is so difficult to achieve, the "difficult mechanization".

After what has been said, it is not surprising that these children are always loners, falling out of any children's community: they themselves do not strive for any community, since they have no personal relationships with anyone (they never have a friend either), and the community also rejects them, since they are always a foreign body; but because of their peculiarities, especially because of their clumsiness, they are always an object of unanimous ridicule in the community, for which they know how to take revenge often enough.

But one thing is very often not only not disturbed in these severely constricted personalities, as in this boy, but is actually well developed above average, namely the intelligence in the narrower sense, the ability to think logically, to formulate one's thoughts well in language (they often find particularly original, almost linguistically creative expressions); very often astonishingly mature special interests are present, often really scientific (e.g. natural research) or technical interests, which of course are often quite cranky and eccentric.He also spoke to the broad range of people he considered as having "autism":On the one hand, the originality of thinking (which always includes a bit of "autism"!) or the intensity of the special interests, which are apparently "hypertrophied" at the expense of many other abilities, are so in the foreground that such people are able to achieve top performance (who does not know the autistic researcher who has become a comic-strip character because of his clumsiness and lack of instinct, but who can achieve excellent things or at least advance his often very narrow special field!) At other times, the autistic originality only comes across as absurd, cranky and useless.Leo Kanner visited the autistic child Donald Triplett on 27 October 1938. Kanner would later say that this was the first time he saw the pattern of autism.

Late 1938-1942 
In 1939 and 1940, Dutch psychiatrist Alfons Chorus of Nijmegen's Pedological Institute published a pair of papers describing children that were "autists" and "schizoid", which today would be considered autistic. In late 1938 or early 1939, the Institute created a category for its child students called "autists", representing those who were particularly self-centred. (The institute's work with the autistic would later be explained by senior Sister and psychologist Ida Frye in her doctoral desertion in 1968).

In 1939, Sukhareva published the three book collection Клинические лекции по психиатрии детского возраста, (Clinical lectures in child psychiatry). The second volume included her findings about schizoid/schizophrenic children. New editions were published in 1959 and 1965.

In November 1940, husband-and-wife psychiatrists the American Lauretta Bender and Austrian-American Paul Schilder of New York University and Bellevue Hospital published the paper Impulsions: A specific disorder of behaviour of children. This paper describes in detail children with what would earlier be considered monomania, and later be considered "special interests":After having studied outspoken disorders (cases 3 and 4), we became aware that similar behavior in children is by no means rare. We saw children who were preoccupied with drawings of sexual content, others who were preoccupied with drawing of animals. They enjoyed their activities and interests, although from time to time they became aware that they were helpless to prevent them. The chief difficulties arose from the fact that their behavior led to a conflict with the surroundings. Casually, these preoccupations might be referred to as obsessions and compulsions. The children, however, felt that they had an interesting and fascinating occupation and regretted merely the lack of understanding of adults. We propose the term "impulsions" for these preoccupations and activities. They do not represent merely a passing or fleeting impulse which suddenly breaks through the defenses and fears on the surface; they are preoccupations and actions which are in the foreground of the person's experience for weeks, months or even years. Impulsions are not obsessions in the strict sense. They have something in common with the obsessive character trends.In April 1941, Kanner presented a paper titled Autistic Disturbances of Affective Contact to a staff conference in The Henry Phipps Psychiatric Clinic in Baltimore. This would be published two years later.

American psychiatrist Charles Bradley of the Emma Pendleton Bradley Home, published the book Schizophrenia in Childhood in 1941, which described what is today considered autism. He cited many other early researchers on the topic, including Sukhareva.

In 1942, Lauretta Bender described the condition of childhood schizophrenia as a "definite syndrome", a "pathology at every level and in every field of integration within the functioning of the central nervous system".

Hans Asperger submitted a postdoctoral habilitation thesis on the topic of autism to the University of Vienna in October 1942. With very few changes, it would be published in June 1944.

April 1943 
Kanner published the paper Autistic Disturbances of Affective Contact in April 1943. It includes case studies of eleven children and their families who have particular things in common. He doesn't use the term autism as the name of the children's condition.

He summarises:The combination of extreme autism, obsessiveness, stereotypy, and echolalia brings the total picture into relationship with some of the basic schizophrenic phenomena … But in spite of the remarkable similarities, the condition differs in many respects from all other known instances of childhood schizophrenia …

All of the children's activities and utterances are governed rigidly and consistently by the powerful desire for aloneness and sameness …

Between the ages of 6 and 8 years, the children begin to play in a group, still never with the other members of the play group, but at least on the periphery alongside the group. Reading skill is acquired quickly, but the children read monotonously, and a story or moving picture is experienced in unrelated portions rather than in its coherent totality …

It is not easy to evaluate the fact that all of our patients have come of highly intelligent parents …

One other fact stands out prominently. In the whole group, there are few really warmhearted fathers and mothers. For the most part, the parents, grandparents, and collaterals are persons strongly preoccupied with abstractions of a scientific, literary, or artistic nature, and limited in genuine interest in people.

Almost all the characteristics described in this paper, notably "autistic aloneness" and "insistence on sameness", are still regarded as typical of autistic spectrum disorder.

As for the cause of the condition, it states:We must, then, assume that these children have come into the world with innate inability to form the usual, biologically provided affective contact with people, just as other children come into the world with innate physical or intellectual hand[i]caps.The term Kanner's syndrome was later coined to describe the children's condition, in particular to distinguish them from differing symptoms of Asperger's children. This syndrome has also sometimes been known as classic autism.

George Frankl published the paper Language and Affective Contact in the same journal edition as Kanner's 1943 paper. It describes different kinds of speech problems children have. In particular, he identifies a group of speech-troubled children defined by having a "lack of contact with persons", which can considered to be an autistic group. Frankl's precise role in the development of the concept of autism is not clear.

July 1943 
British scientists the neurologist James Martin and geneticist Julia Bell described a pedigree of X-linked intellectual disability in July 1943. (This would later be called Fragile X syndrome, and is now considered one of the genetic causes of autism).

June 1944 
Hans Asperger published his paper Die „Autistischen Psychopathen" im Kindesalter (The "Autistic Psychopaths" in Childhood) in June 1944. It was almost identical to the thesis he submitted in 1942. It included four cases studies and related analysis. This work offered by far the most detailed description of autism as yet published.

Asperger notes:If one has learned to pay attention to the characteristic expressions of the autistic nature, one finds this psychopathic disorder, especially in a milder degree, not so rare, even in children …

…the individual personalities [of autistic people] stand out from one another not only through the degree of the contact disorder, through the level of intellectual and character strengths, but also through numerous individual traits, special ways of reacting, and special interests (which are particularly independent and different within this group of people) …

The difficulties which the young child has in learning the simple skills of practical life and in social adjustment come from the same disorder which causes the learning and behavioural difficulties of the school child, which causes the professional difficulties and the special achievements of the adolescent, and which speaks to the adult's marital and social conflicts …

Unfortunately, not in all cases, not even in most cases, does the positive, future-oriented traits of the autistic personality prevail. We have already talked about the fact that there are autistic characters of very different personality levels: from an originality bordering on genius to unrealistic, insular, inefficient oddballs to the most severely contact-disordered, automaton-like imbeciles …

With the cleverest of them, the teachers sometimes overlook the poorer performance in the mechanizable learning requirements because of their other achievements, because of their clever answers. Most of the time, however, the teacher is in despair over the agonizing trouble that arises for both parts from this disruption in the way they work …

We want to show that the basic disorder of autistic psychopaths is a narrowing of their relationships with the environment, that the personality of these children can be understood from this point of view, that it is "thoroughly organized" from that point of view …

Very differentiated likes and dislikes in the area of the sense of taste are almost regularly found - the frequent occurrence in the same direction is more proof for us of the unity of our type … Many of these children have an aversion to certain tactile sensations, which goes to abnormal degrees …

Either [autistic children] don't notice the things around them at all, for example they don't care about toys at all, or they have an absurdly strong attachment to certain individual things, never take their eyes off a whip, a block of wood, a mere rudimentary doll, can't eat, can't go to sleep if the "fetish" isn't with them, make the most difficult scenes trying to snatch the thing they've held so passionately from them …

That one has to keep oneself clean and in addition meet the numerous requirements of personal hygiene can only be taught to them with great difficulty, often not at all completely - even the adults, who then have mostly chosen intellectual professions, can walk around unwashed and unkept …

The autistic psychopath is an extreme variant of male intelligence, male character. Typical differences between boys' and girls' intelligence can already be found within the normal range of variation: girls are generally the better learners, they are good at concrete, descriptive, practical, clean, eager work; on the other hand, logic, the ability for abstraction, the precise thinking and formulating, that independent research is much more in the possibilities of the boys …

While, as already mentioned, we have not met any girl in whom the image of the autistic psychopath has been fully developed, we have met several mothers of autistic children who were themselves markedly autistic in their behaviour …

The steadfastness and the power that lies in the "spontaneous" activity of the autistic, the narrowing down to individual areas of life, to an isolated special interest - this proves to be a positive value that enables these people to achieve special achievements in their areas. Especially with the autistic we see - with far greater clarity than with the "Normals" - that they seem predestined for a certain profession from their earliest youth, that this profession grows out of their special talents as a result of fate.In regards to his work's academic antecedents, Asperger frequently acknowledges Bleuler, and also:There are certain similarities between the autistic psychopaths and the schizothyms of Kretschmer, further with certain forms of the disintegrated by E. R. Jaensch and above all with the "introverted thinking type" by Jung.(It has been suggested that Asperger was also likely aware of Sukhareva's work.)

The particular patterns Asperger identified later became known as "Asperger syndrome", particularly those that differed from the children described by Kanner.

Despite many important English-publishing autism researchers being fluent in German, and his work being covered in some English language works, Asperger's concept of autism would be almost unknown by non-German-speaking psychological professionals until the 1970s. It would take yet longer for substantial numbers of non-German-speaking people it describes to hear about it.

September 1944 
In September 1944, Kanner published the paper Early Infantile Autism, giving his newly identified condition a new name. The paper has much in common with Kanner's 1943 paper. It included only two case studies, but had a much more detailed introduction.

Kanner writes:During the past six years, I have become increasingly interested in a number of children, twenty by now, whose behavior differs uniquely and markedly from anything reported so far. Among the individual patients there are great variations in the degree of the disturbance, in the manifestation of specific features, and in the step-by-step development in the course of time. Yet in spite of this seeming divergence they all present essential common characteristics to such an extent that they cannot but be considered as fundamentally alike from the point of view of psychopathology. Many of these children were brought to us primarily with the assumption that they were severely feeble-minded or with the question of auditory impairment. Psychometric test performances yielded indeed very low quotients, and often enough absent or inadequate responses to sounds of any kind gave good reason for the suspicion of deafness. But careful examination showed very soon that the children's cognitive potentialities were only masked by the basic affective disorder; in fact, a few of the children had started out by amazing their parents with phenomenal feats of rote repetition. In all instances it could be established that hearing as such was not defective.

The common denominator in all these patients is their disability to relate themselves in the ordinary way to people and situations from the beginning of life. Their parents referred to them as always having been "self-sufficient", "like in a shell", "happiest when left alone", "acting as if people weren't there", "giving the impression of silent wisdom". The ease histories indicate invariably the presence from the start of extreme autistic aloneness which, wherever possible, disregards, ignores, shuts out anything that comes to the child from the outside …

An excellent rote memory, retaining many poems, songs, lists of presidents, and the like, made the parents at first think of the children proudly as child prodigies …

The same type of literalness exists also with regard to prepositions.

Alfred, when asked, "What is this picture about?" replied: "People are moving about …"

The child's behavior is governed by an anxiously obsessive desire for the maintenance of sameness that nobody but the child himself may disrupt on rare occasions. Changes of routine, of furniture arrangement, of a pattern, of the order in which everyday acts are carried out can drive him to despair …

Every one of the twenty children has a good relation to objects; he is interested in them; he can play with them happily for hours. The children's relation to people is altogether different. Every one of the children upon entering the office immediately went after blocks, toys, or other objects without paying the least attention to the persons present.Kanner's two papers became very influential in the English-speaking world, the Americas and elsewhere.

April 1948 
The newly formed United Nations established the World Health Organization (WHO) on 7 April 1948. One of its first tasks was to create a global standard list of all health conditions, which was approved by an international conference at the end of April. The WHO adopted and greatly expanded an earlier list of fatal conditions, the ILCD-5. The first International Classification of Diseases (ICD-6) soon became widely used in Europe and elsewhere.

It included "primary childhood behaviour disorders" (324), which was used to categorise all children with what was considered disordered behaviour. There was also the condition of "specific learning defects" (326.0). One of its "disorders of character, behaviour, and intelligence" was the "pathological personality" of "schizoid personality" (320.0). Various categories of schizophrenia (300) were additionally represented, though not specifically "childhood" schizophrenia. (The DSM-II would later explicitly state that its concept of childhood schizophrenia had no ICD equivalent).

The ICD would not substantially change its representation of autism-related conditions until the ICD-9 in 1975.

July 1949 
Kanner published a third autism paper in 1949, entitled Problems of nosology and psychodynamics of early infantile autism. The first part aims to reinforce the separateness of early infantile autism from other conditions accepted by the medical community. He notes "Early infantile autism bears no resemblance to Heller's disease". He says it is however the same condition earlier identified by three women, "Ssucharewa [a German spelling of Sukhareva], Grebelskaya-Albatz, and Despert."

The paper also says much about the personality type of the parents of autistic children, including:One is struck again and again by what I should like to call a mechanization of human relationships. Most of the parents declare outright that they are not comfortable in the company of people; they prefer reading, writing, painting, making music, or just "thinking". Those who speak of themselves as sociable tend to qualify this by explaining that they have no use for ordinary chatter. They are, on the whole, polite and dignified people who are impressed by seriousness and disdainful of anything that smacks of frivolity.He also notes that the parents were typically "reared sternly in emotional refrigerators", and that "the parents did not seem to know what to do with the children when they had them. They lacked the warmth which the babies needed."

1950s to 1970s

The 1950s

The League for Emotionally Disturbed Children 
The League for Emotionally Disturbed Children was founded in New York in 1950 by 20 parents of emotionally disturbed children, including doctor and researcher Jacques May. The group established the League School in Brooklyn in 1953. Enrolment was limited to children diagnosed with "childhood schizophrenia". The school helped establish a new method of teaching, led by teacher Carl Fenichel and assisted by psychiatrists Alfred Freedman and Zelda Klapper. In 1955, it changed its name to the National Organization for Mentally Ill Children. Leo Kanner noted in 1956 that the organisation had sponsored research that was "attempting to uncover metabolic and electrophysiologic abnormalities" in autistic children. (In 1966, Fenichel would establish the League School of Boston.)

Refrigerator mother theory 
In the early 1950s, the refrigerator mother theory emerged as an accepted explanation for Kanner's early infantile autism. The hypothesis was based on the idea that autistic behaviors stem from the emotional frigidity, lack of warmth, and cold, distant, rejecting demeanor of a child's mother. Parents of children with an ASD experienced blame, guilt and self-doubt, especially as the theory was embraced by the medical establishment and went largely unchallenged into the mid-1960s. (While an inspiration for it, Leo Kanner himself eventually rejected the theory.)

Austrian-British psychologist Anna Freud and British psychologist Sophie Dann published a paper in 1951 that found that the extreme conditions of deprivation of affection of the Nazi concentration camps did not induce autistic pathology in children. This was later used as an argument against the refrigerator mother theory.

DSM-I 
The first edition of the American Psychiatric Association's Diagnostic and Statistical Manual of Mental Disorders (DSM) was released in 1952. The DSM was created to give each of America's mental disorders a clear definition. Two of the conditions it defined included reference to Bleuler's understanding of "autism" - the symptom of keeping-to-oneself. Each was named primarily using another of Bleuler's terms, and defined with a paragraph.

One was "Schizophrenic reaction, childhood type" (000-x28):Here will be classified those schizophrenic reactions occurring before puberty. The clinical picture may differ from schizophrenic reactions occurring in other age periods because of the immaturity and plasticity of the patient at the time of onset of the reaction. Psychotic reactions in children, manifesting primarily autism, will be classified here. Special symptomatology may be added to the diagnosis as manifestations.

(The term "schizophrenia" was defined elsewhere in the manual. "It represents a group of psychotic reactions characterized by fundamental disturbances in reality relationships and concept formations, with affective, behavioral, and intellectual disturbances in varying degrees and mixtures. The disorders are marked by strong tendency to retreat from reality, by emotional disharmony, unpredictable disturbances in stream of thought, regressive behavior, and in some, by a tendency to 'deterioration.'")

The other was "Schizoid personality" (000-x42):Inherent traits in such personalities are (1) avoidance of close relations with others, (2) inability to express directly hostility or even ordinary aggressive feelings, and (3) autistic thinking. These qualities result early in coldness, aloofness, emotional detachment, fearfulness, avoidance of competition, and day dreams revolving around the need for omnipotence. As children, they are usually quiet, shy, obedient, sensitive and rearing. At puberty, they frequently become more withdrawn, then manifesting the aggregate of personality traits known as introversion, namely, quietness, seclusiveness, "shut-in-ness", and unsociability, often with eccentricity.Dirk van Krevelen

Dirk van Krevelen published the paper Een geval van 'early infantil autism (A case of early infantile autism) in 1952. It was the first European paper about "early infantile autism". In it, van Krevelen notes that while the condition is well known by United States child psychiatrists, it is virtually unknown in Europe.

 Ronald Fairbairn 
In 1952, British psychiatrist Ronald Fairbairn published the paper Schizoid Factors in the Personality as part of a book. (An early form of it had been given as a lecture in November 1940). It included Fairbairn's belief that the schizoid type was defined by "(1) an attitude of omnipotence, (2) an attitude of isolation and detachment and, (3) a preoccupation with inner reality", with last being by far the most important. Fairbairn believed that people became schizoid because they had been unable to get the parental love they sought when they were small children. He also saw an equivalency between being "schizoid" and "introverted".

 Kanner and Eisenberg's 1956 papers 

In February 1956, American psychiatrist Leon Eisenberg published the paper The Autistic Child in Adolescence, which compared the childhood and adolescence of 63 autistic people.﻿﻿ He found that almost one third had achieved at least a moderate social adjustment over the period, predominantly those who had possessed "meaningful language" by the age of 5. He also found that "the fundamental feature [of Autism] is a disturbance in social perception."

In July that year, Kanner and fellow Johns Hopkins researcher Eisenberg published the paper Early infantile autism, 1943-1955. Providing Kanner's most concise definition of the condition yet published, the paper says:In the light of experience with a tenfold increase in clinical material, we would now isolate these two pathognomonic features, both of which must be present: extreme self-isolation and the obsessive insistence on the preservation of sameness, features that may be regarded as primary, employing the term as Bleuler did in grouping the symptoms of schizophrenia. The vicissitudes of language development, often the most striking and challenging of the presenting phenomena, may be seen as derivatives of the basic disturbance in human relatedness.Supporting the refrigerator mother hypothesis, the paper notes: "The emotional frigidity in the typical autistic family suggests a dynamic experiential factor in the genesis of the disorder in the child."

 Charles Ferster 
While serving as an assistant professor of psychology at Indiana University from 1957 to 1962, Charles Ferster employed errorless learning to instruct young autistic children how to speak. This was an early example of what would later be known as applied behaviour analysis.

 Bernard Rimland 
American psychologist Bernard Rimland published an article about a 9-year-old with autism in Scientific American in 1959. This increased public awareness of the condition in the United States.

 The 1960s 

 Mildred Creak's nine point definition 
Until 1961, autistic children in the UK were often institutionalised from a young age. Poor disease control in these institutions often led to a quick death. At this time, the British government sought to discover exactly how many psychotic children there were in the UK. They commissioned Mildred Creak of Great Ormond Street Hospital to lead a group to define the symptoms of childhood psychosis/schizophrenia, and the group completed their work the same year. They came up with a nine-point definition that soon became widely used in that country, and in time would form the definition of the condition used in most of the world.

The nine points were more detailed than Sukhareva's similar definition. They lacked the earlier definition's mention of OCD and clumsiness, and added the inclusion of anxiety. A major difference came in Creak's ninth point: "A background of serious retardation in which islets of normal, near normal, or exceptional intellectual function or skill may appear."

As the new definition took off, the autistic condition began to be seen as involving a lack of fantasy rather than an excess of it.

 United Kingdom 
British teacher Sybil Elgar began a school for autistic children in the basement of her London home in 1962. Later that year Elgar, Lorna Wing and others established the UK's Society for Autistic Children. (It became known as the National Autistic Society in 1982.) In 1965, it set up The Society School for Autistic Children, which was later named after Elgar. As of 2023, the society operates seven schools across England.

British psychiatrist John K Wing edited the first edition of Early Childhood Autism; Clinical, Educational and Social Aspects in 1966, which included chapters from both Ivar Lovaas and Lorna Wing. Later editions would contain different chapters.

Representative organisation Scottish Autism began in 1968, and continues independently today. (Autism Northern Ireland would follow in 1991.)

 Autism science in 1962 
1962 saw a number of notable scientific publications about autism published.

In January, Charles Ferster and Marian DeMyer published the paper A method for the experimental analysis of the behavior of autistic children. This was possibly the first paper to show how behaviorism could be used to teach autistic students.

Also in January, Dirk van Krevelen and Christine Kuipers published a paper in English regarding the work of Hans Asperger, The psychopathology of autistic psychopathy.

German psychiatrist Gerhard Bosch published the book Der Frühkindliche Autismus: Eine Klinische und Phänomenologisch-Anthropologische Untersuchung am Leitfaden der Sprache. Among other things, it briefly compared the work of Asperger and Kanner and suggested both were variants of the same condition. In 1965, Kanner said he had read this book. Bruno Bettleheim cited it substantially in his later work. The book would be translated into English in 1970.

 United States 
Rosemary Kennedy, sister of US President John F Kennedy, was autistic. Her sister Eunice Kennedy Shriver made the public aware of this through an article in the New York Post in September 1962. Rosemary's treatment with brain surgery severely impacted her.

The US Community Mental Health Act (CMHA) of 1963 prompted the closure of most of the country's residential institutions for the mentally unwell. The intent was that as many people as possible would be enabled to live freely in homes without full time professional supervision, but could draw on support from community mental health centres. The introduction of Medicaid in 1965 increased the rate of institutional closure.In 1964, Bernard Rimland published the book Infantile Autism: The Syndrome and Its Implications for a Neural Theory of Behavior, which refuted the refrigerator theory. Instead, Rimland suggested, autism was a result of biochemical defects "triggered by environmental assaults". It included a forward by Leo Kanner. The book challenged the medical establishment's perceptions of autism. Rimland's message resonated with parents, who wanted to share their stories with him and ask for advice. (The book also includes a reference to "Asperger Syndrome".)

Philip K. Dick published the science fiction book Martian Time-Slip in 1964, which features an autistic boy with special powers.

In February 1965, American TV aired an episode of the series Directions entitled Conall, the story of a boy with autism told by his family.

In May that year, Life magazine published an article on the work led by Norwegian-American behaviourist psychologist Ivar Lovaas at UCLA's Young Autism Project. "Screams, Slaps and Love" showed how the adults working with autistic children hit them as part of their training.

Both this TV episode and magazine article led to further awareness of the condition in the United States. Later in 1965, this newfound awareness coalesced as Rimland, Lovaas, nurse Ruth C. Sullivan and others founded the National Society for Autistic Children (NSAC). Leo Kanner and Carl Fenichel soon joined its Professional Advisory Board.

Austrian-American psychologist Bruno Bettelheim at the University of Chicago countered Rimland's assertions about the causes of autism in his 1967 book Empty Fortress: Infantile Autism and the Birth of the Self. It greatly popularised the refrigerator theory. Bettelheim subsequently appeared multiple times on The Dick Cavett Show in the 70s to discuss theories of autism and psychoanalysis. (Refrigerator theory has since been refuted in the scientific literature, including a 2015 systematic review which showed absolutely no association between caregiver interaction and language outcomes in ASD patients.)

Another notable book of 1967 was The Siege: The First Eight Years of an Autistic Child by American teacher Clara Claiborne Park. It told the story of Clara's daughter and Clara's efforts to help her.

Bernard Rimland left his central role at the NSAC in 1967, founding the Autism Research Institute. However, he remained attached to the NSAC.

Starting in the late 1960s, "autism" started to be considered as a separate syndrome from "schizophrenia", just as Bleuler had separated schizophrenia from dementia.

 New organisations in many countries 
The first French national autism organisation, the ASITP (Association au service des inadaptés présentant des troubles de la personnalité), was founded in Paris in 1963.

Kfar Tikva was established in Israel as a village for people with "cognitive, developmental and emotional disabilities" in 1964. This includes autistic people. (The similar Kishorit community opened in 1997.)

In 1964–7, Australian autistic people and their parents founded what is now Autism SA (1964), the Autistic Children's Association of New South Wales (now Aspect, 1966), Victorian Autistic Children's and Adult's Association (now Amaze, 1967), Autistic Children's Association of Queensland (now Autism Queensland, 1967), and what is now the Autism Association of Western Australia (1967). These organisations continue today. (Later, Autism Tasmania (1992) and Autism NT (2002) would be founded.)

In Brazil, the Comunidade Terapêutica Leo Kanner (Leo Kanner Therapeutic Community) was founded in Porto Alegre in 1965.

40 parents of autistic children met in Tokyo in December 1966. In February 1967, they and others formed the Association of Autistic Children's Parents. A national body was established in 1968. In time, this would become  (日本自閉症協会).Sensory processing disorder'''

Sensory processing disorder is a condition in which multisensory input is not adequately processed in order to provide appropriate responses to the demands of the environment. The concept was developed by American occupational therapist Anna Jean Ayres in the 1960s. The disorder continues to be recognised by some major occupational therapy bodies. (Developmental coordination disorder is a similar concept that is now recognised in the DSM and ICD.)

 Hyperlexia 
Hyperlexia is when a child can ready at an early age. The term was coined by Norman E. Silberberg and Margaret C. Silberberg in 1967.

 Applied behavior analysis 
From the late 1950s, Charles Ferster and others used the new science of behaviorism to teach people with autism and other mental conditions. This led researchers at the University of Kansas to start the Journal of Applied Behavior Analysis in the northern spring of 1968, establishing the concept of applied behavior analysis (ABA). A concise definition of the concept, still used today, was given in the first issue of the journal. ABA soon came to be used extensively with autistic children in the United States and elsewhere. (Two major American professional associations would later be founded for ABA practitioners, with the credentialing Behavior Analysis Accrediting Board founded in 1998.)

 Asperger's 1968 paper 

In April 1968, Hans Asperger wrote about the similarities and differences of his and Kanner's concepts of autism in the paper Zur Differentialdiagnose des kindlichen Autismus (On the differential diagnosis of childhood autism), noting:As different as both types are in their intellectual and personality level, there is an astonishing similarity in central features as well as in small details; it was undoubtedly these that made both authors independently choose the same name to express the nature of the disorder.Highlighting his broad use of the term autism, he also remarked:Yes, it seems to us that a dash of "autism" is absolutely necessary for certain top scientific or artistic achievements: a certain turning away from the concrete, simple and practical; a narrowing down to a specific, dynamically and highly original special field, sometimes to the point of eccentricity; a narrowing or abnormality of emotional relationships with other people.Leo Kanner republished a copy of his 1934 paper in the same journal edition.https://iacapap.org/_Resources/Persistent/ee17c0701c3ef7859fc952ed2d7947bc970754e6/History_of_IACAPAP-75-YEARS.pdf

 Michael Rutter 
British psychiatrist Michael Rutter's extensive research in the 1960s provided statistically robust evidence that the syndrome of "early infantile autism" existed. His most cited paper of the period was published in October 1968.

 DSM-II 
In the DSM-II (1968), the symptom of autism was allocated to three different conditions. Its description of childhood schizophrenia was more detailed than in the DSM-I.

Schizophrenia, childhood type (295.8):This category is for cases in which schizophrenic symptoms appear before puberty. The condition may be manifested by autistic, atypical, and withdrawn behavior; failure to develop identity separate from the mother's; and general unevenness, gross immaturity and inadequacy in development. These developmental defects may result in mental retardation, which should also be diagnosed. (This category is for use in the United States and does not appear in ICD-8. It is equivalent to "Schizophrenic reaction, childhood type" in DSM-I.)Withdrawing reaction of childhood (or adolescence) (308.1):This disorder is characterized by seclusiveness, detachment, sensitivity, shyness, timidity, and general inability to form close interpersonal relationships. This diagnosis should be reserved for those who cannot be classified as having Schizophrenia (q.v.) and whose tendencies toward withdrawal have not yet stabilized enough to justify the diagnosis of Schizoid personality (q.v.).)Schizoid personality (301.2):This behavior pattern manifests shyness, over-sensitivity, seclusiveness, avoidance of close or competitive relationships, and often eccentricity. Autistic thinking without loss of capacity to recognize reality is common, as is daydreaming and the inability to express hostility and ordinary aggressive feelings. These patients react to disturbing experiences and conflicts with apparent detachment.

 The 1970s 

 1970-1974 
In 1970, NSAC launched an ongoing national autism awareness campaign in the US. In 1972, it started the first National Autistic Children's week, which later evolved into Autism Awareness Month.

In Italy,  (AIABA, The Italian Association for Assistance to Autistic Children) was founded by parents of children with autism in 1970.

In Germany, what is now  (Autism Germany) was founded in 1970.

1970 also saw the release of the English translation of Gerhard Bosch's 1962 book as Infantile autism: a clinical and phenomenological-anthropological investigation taking language as the guide. It was translated by Derek and Inge Jordan, and included an introduction from Bruno Bettelheim. The English language edition included a large appendix about Asperger and Kanner not included in the German one. It used the term Asperger's syndrome to describe the symptoms of Asperger's patients.

The Journal of Autism and Childhood Schizophrenia was established in January 1971, with Leo Kanner as the editor. This was the first scientific journal devoted to autism. Kanner wrote a paper called Childhood psychosis: A historical overview for the first issue. It acknowledges the work of a broader range of people than Kanner had previously, but not that of Asperger or Frankl.

Another paper in the first edition however compares Kanner's syndrome (early infantile autism) with Asperger's syndrome (autistic psychosis).

Dirk van Krevelen notes:We can take it for granted that neither [Kanner and Asperger] was then aware of the other's work. It took nine years before the first case of "early infantile autism" was published in Europe …

Kanner's publications are well known internationally. I doubt sincerely whether this can be said about Asperger's work.It also differentiates the two conditions through a list of seven differences.

For the second edition, Kanner traced the eleven children in his 1943 paper, and determined how they had grown up. The results were published in Follow-up Study of Eleven Autistic Children Originally Reported in 1943. He concludes:This 30-year followup has not indicated too much concrete progress from the time of the original report, beyond the refinement of diagnostic criteria. There has been a hodge-podge of theories, hypotheses, and speculations, and there have been many valiant, well-motivated attempts at alleviation awaiting eventual evaluation. It is expected, with good justification, that a next 30- or 20-year followup of other groups of autistic children will be able to present a report of newly obtained factual knowledge and material for a more hopeful prognosis than the present chronicle has proved to be.The University of North Carolina's TEACCH Autism Program was founded by German-American psychologist Eric Schopler in 1971, building on work started by Schopler and a colleague in 1964. It recognizes autism as a lifelong condition and does not aim to cure but to respond to autism as a culture. It uses behaviourism in a small group setting. Its methods have been adopted by many practitioners.

British researcher Lorna Wing of the Institute of Psychiatry, London published the book Autistic children - a guide for parents in 1971. Louise Despert endorsed the book, and provided its forward.

American psychiatrist Stella Chess conducted studies on the potential link between rubella and autism. In 1971, she found that children with congenital rubella syndrome developed autism at rates 200 times higher than the general population at the time. She followed this up with a 1977 study.

South African-British psychiatrist Israel Kolvin provided much evidence that "early infantile autism" was a very different condition to later onset schizophrenia through two studies published in 1971.

In 1972, German-American Wolf Wolfensberger released his book Normalisation. It advocated that society should provide opportunities to people with disabilities so that they can do what people without those disabilities can do.

In Canada's most populous province, the Ontario Society for Autistic Children was founded by parents in 1973. (After a number of name changes, it became Autism Ontario in 2006.)

Leo Kanner published the book Childhood Psychosis: Initial Studies and New Insights in 1973, which reviewed 30 years of research into early infantile autism and childhood schizophrenia. In it he bemoaned the diagnosing of intellectually disabled children with a few autistic features as singularly having autism.

The term alexithymia was conceputalised by American psychiatrists John Case Nemiah and Peter Sifneos in 1973.Taylor GJ & Taylor HS (1997). Alexithymia. In M. McCallum & W.E. Piper (Eds.) Psychological mindedness: A contemporary understanding. Munich: Lawrence Erlbaum Associates pp. 28–31 It refers to people having difficulties in understanding the emotions experienced by themselves or others. This is common in people with autism, but is not always the case.

Eric Schopler would become the second editor of the Journal of Autism and Childhood Schizophrenia in 1974, staying in that role until 1997.

The Israeli Society for Children and Adults with Autism (ALUT) was founded in 1974. As of 2023 it has over 2,500 employees, providing services to over 15,000 families.

 1975-1979 
In January 1975, Autismus Deutsche Schweiz (Autism German Switzerland) began in German-speaking Switzerland. (This was followed with an allied body in French-speaking Switzerland in 1985, and one in Italian-speaking Switzerland in 1989. The three groups form a confederation called Autism Switzerland.)

In 1975, American-British psychologist Donald Meltzer released his book Explorations in Autism: a psychoanalytic study, documenting the treatment of childhood autism following the thinking of Melanie Klein.

The United States passed the Education for All Handicapped Children Act (EHA) in November 1975. In 1970, US schools educated only one in five children with disabilities. Many states had laws excluding emotionally disturbed and intellectual disabled children from public education. The EHA guaranteed each disabled child a free and appropriate public education. (The act became the Individuals with Disabilities Education Act (IDEA) in 1990).

The home-based autism treatment program Son-Rise, was developed by American couple Barry Kaufman and Samahria Kaufman in the early 1970s. Barry published a book on the method in 1976, (Son-Rise), claiming that it cured his son of autism. An American TV movie based on the book, Son-Rise: A Miracle of Love, was released in 1979. It was influential in Brazil, and was repeatedly aired there during the 1980s.

Autism Society Canada was established in 1976.

Autism support group APAFAC was founded in Catalonia in 1976. It was joined by Aspanaes in Galacia in 1979, and similar bodies in other parts of Spain after that.

American psychiatrist Susan Folstein and British psychiatrist Micheal Rutter published a significant twin study establishing the genetic basis of autism in September 1977.

The  (NVA) (Dutch Association for Autism) was founded in 1978 by parents of children with autism.

The international medical condition classification system, the ICD, greatly changed the way it categorised autism-related conditions in 1978, with the release of the ICD-9. "Infantile autism" (299.0) was now recognised as a condition, with separate sub-categories for it having a "current or active state" or "residual state". Its definition of this condition was based on the criteria devised by Mildred Creak for "childhood schizophrenia" in the early 1960s.

In the category of "disturbance of emotions specific to childhood and adolescence", the ICD now included "sensitivity, shyness and social withdrawal disorder" (313.2), which included the subcategories "shyness disorder of childhood", "introverted disorder of childhood" and "elective mutism". "Schizoid personality disorder" (301.2) now had two varieties, a general one, and "introverted personality".

Considering the wide difference of autistic traits in different people, Wing and Judith Gould coined the term autism spectrum in their 1979 paper Severe impairments of social interaction and associated abnormalities in children: epidemiology and classification.

The "developmental, individual-difference, relationship-based model" (DIR) of autism diagnosis and treatment was developed by American psychiatrist Stanley Greenspan in 1979. This was later further developed into the Floortime program.

The opioid excess theory hypothesis of autism was first proposed by Jaak Panksepp in a 1979 paper.

Hans Asperger gave a lecture in Fribourg in 1977, of which a translation in English titled "Problems of Infantile Autism" was published in 1979.

 DSM-III, pervasive developmental disorder and other conditions (1980-1987) 
Under advisement from the NSAC, the DSM-III (1980) turned what was previously defined as childhood schizophrenia into three kinds of "pervasive developmental disorder" (PDD). "Infantile autism" began before a child was 30 months old, and "childhood onset pervasive developmental disorder" began between 30 months and 12 years. A third variety, "atypical pervasive developmental disorder" was similar but lesser than the other two, and could begin at any time. "Elective mutism" was now categorised as in independent condition.

"Withdrawing reaction of childhood (or adolescence)" became "schizoid disorder of childhood or adolescence".

"Schizoid personality" in adults was split into "schizoid personality disorder", "avoidant personality disorder" and "schizotypal personality disorder". The first two differed by the motivation of diagnosed person - "avoidant" people had social difficulties but wanted to be social, while "schizoid" people had social difficulties and were happy to stay that way. "Schizotypal" people were on the schizophrenia spectrum - the condition was not well aligned with conceptions of autism.

The DSM-III gave much more detail for its conditions than previous editions had done, providing comprehensive diagnostic criteria for the first time.

Domus Instituto de Autismo was established in Mexico in May 1980 by parents of children with autism.

Lorna Wing's February 1981 publication of the paper Asperger's Syndrome: A Clinical Account greatly increased awareness of the existence of Hans Asperger's autism work. Wing summarised Asperger's autism syndrome, and made two challenges to points he had made. She also provided six case studies of her own, and much additional analysis. The paper brought the concept of "Asperger's syndrome" into the spotlight, leading to it being recognised by many psychological practitioners.

Regarding the breadth of people with the condition, Wing notes:All the features that characterize Asperger's syndrome can be found in varying degrees in the normal population …

Even though Asperger's syndrome does appear to merge into the normal continuum, there are many cases in whom the problems are so marked that the suggestion of a distinct pathology seems a more plausible explanation than a variant of normality.As to the relationship between schizoid personality disorder and Asperger's syndrome, Wing writes:The lack of empathy, single-mindedness, odd communication, social isolation and oversensitivity of people with Asperger's syndrome are features that are also included in the definitions of schizoid personality …

There is no question that Asperger's syndrome can be regarded as a form of schizoid personality. The question is whether this grouping is of any value …Regarding treatment, Wing recommended:There is no known treatment that has any effect on the basic impairments underlying Asperger's syndrome, but handicaps can be diminished by appropriate management and education …

Techniques of behaviour modification as used with autistic children can possibly be helpful if applied with sensitivity. However, Asperger (1979) expressed considerable reservations using these methods with children with his syndrome who are bright enough to be aware of and, as Asperger put it, 'to value their freedom' …The Early Start Denver Model of autism treatment for young children was developed in 1981 by Sally J Rogers and Geraldine Dawson. It was initially called the "play school model", because its main actions happened during children's play. It is considered a variety of ABA.

The LEAP (Learning Experiences - An Alternative Program for Preschoolers and Parents) curriculum model was developed by American psychologist Phillip Strainhttps://www.sbbh.pitt.edu/sites/default/files/strain_phillip_leader.pdf of the University of Pittsburgh in 1981. The first paper explaining it was published in 1984. The program has autistic and non-autistic pre-schoolers share a classroom, with the latter assisting the former. It is considered a more-cognitive rather than a more-behaviourist form of teaching. It is also considered one of the best researched forms of training for autistic pre-schoolers.

Also in 1981, Jakob Lutz published the paper "Hans Asperger und Leo Kanner zum Gedenken" (Hans Asperger and Leo Kanner in memoriam).

Autism was first diagnosed in China in 1982 by Professor Tao Guotai (陶国泰) from the Nanjing Brain Hospital. He presented the case in a Chinese journal. In the late 1980s, he introduced his findings to the global audience in English.

Autism-Europe began in 1983, co-ordinating autism organisations across Europe.

In Brazil,  (AMA, Association of Friends of the Autistic) was founded in 1983. Within a year of this, they were running a school. They are their country's main autism association.

The US congress endorsed Autism Awareness Month in 1984.

The Autism Society of Taiwan (中華民國自閉症總會) was founded in January 1985.

The Picture Exchange Communication System (PECS) was developed in 1985 at the Delaware Autism Program by Andy Bondy and Lori Frost. It is a communication teaching method for people with limited speech.

In September 1985, Felix F. de la Cruz outlined extensively the physical, psychological, and cytogenetic characteristics of people with Fragile X syndrome in addition to their prospects for therapy.

Positive behavior support (PBS, PBIS, SWPBS or SWPBIS) emerged from the University of Oregon in the mid-1980s. It is a type of ABA that is typically used in schools. Tim Lewis is a noted practitioner of the concept, and is often credited as a co-founder. The Association for Positive Behaviour Support was founded in 2003.

The "China Compulsory Education Law" (中华人民共和国义务教育法) was enacted in 1986. Like the American EHA, it required public schools to accept students with disabilities.Multiplex developmental disorder was conceptualised by American Yale University researchers Donald J. Cohen (psychiatrist), Rhea Paul (speech pathologist) and Fred Volkmar (psychiatrist) in March 1986. They proposed that it be recognised as a variety of autism in the DSM, however this did not occur.

Pivotal response treatment (PRT) was pioneered by Americans Robert Koegel, Mary O'Dell and Lynn Kern Koegel in 1987. It is a form of ABA used with young children.

Ivar Lovaas released a major report on the decades established UCLA Young Autism Project in 1987, defining a new method of ABA. Lovaas controversially reported that half his pre-school patients that received intensive therapy now had an IQ level equal to their non-autistic peers, and had "recovered" from their autism. It is sometimes called the "Lovaas method/model/program" and sometimes the "UCLA model/intervention". It has become the primary form of Early Intensive Behavior Intervention (EIBI), and now is often referred to by that name as well. One methodology it developed was discrete trial training.

 DSM-III-R, autistic disorder, PDD-NOS and other conditions (1987–1994) 

 1987-1991 
The DSM-III-R (1987) merged "infantile autism" and "childhood onset pervasive developmental disorder" as the new "autistic disorder". It broadened the range of neurotypes that were considered "autistic" by clinicians. The DSM's third PDD category became "pervasive developmental disorder not otherwise specified" (PDDNOS, later PDD-NOS). "Schizoid disorder of childhood or adolescence" was absorbed by the PDD category as a whole. "Schizoid personality disorder" in adults, "avoidant personality disorder" and "elective mutism" continued to exist.

The DSM-III-R noted that "The evidence suggests, however, that [autistic disorder] is merely the most severe and prototypical form of the general category Pervasive Developmental Disorders … Whereas in clinical settings Autistic Disorder is more commonly seen than PDDNOS, studies in England and the United States, using criteria similar to those in this manual, suggest that PDDNOS is more common than Autistic Disorder in the general population."

1987 saw America's National Association for Autistic Children became the Autism Society of America.

Popular American movie Rain Man was released in 1988. Its titular character was an autistic man. Bernard Rimland was consulted on how the character was portrayed. The movie did much to define public understanding of the condition.

A controversial claim suggested that watching extensive amounts of television may cause autism. This hypothesis was largely based on research suggesting that the increasing rates of autism in the 1970s and 1980s were linked to the growth of cable television at the time.

Social skill teaching method, Social Stories, began its development in 1989 by American teacher Carol Gray. A survey of Ontario autism support workers in 2011 found that 58% had support programs influenced by her.

A new national French autism organisation, was founded in February 1989.

Representative organisation Autism South Africa (A;SA) was founded in 1989 by concerned parents and professionals.

The Autism Diagnostic Observation Schedule (ADOS) was developed in 1989 by Catherine Lord, Michael Rutter, Susan Goode, Jacquelyn Heemsbergen, Heather Jordan, Lynn Mawhood and Eric Schopler. It became commercially available in 2001. (A revised version, ADOS-2, was released in 2012).

The Autism Diagnostic Interview (ADI) was also developed in 1989 by Ann Le Couteur, Michael Rutter, Catherine Lord, Patricia Rios, Sarah Robertson, Mary Holdgrafer and John McLennan. An updated version, the ADI-R, was commercially released in 2003.

The book Autism: Explaining the Enigma was released by Uta Frith in 1989. It explained to non-autistic people how autistic people thought. A second edition was published in 2003.

In Saudi Arabia, the Saudi Autistic Society (الجمعية السعودية الخيرية للتوح) was founded in January 1990.

Mind-blindness is a term first published in early 1990 by British psychologist Simon Baron-Cohen at the University of Cambridge. It refers to the idea that "people with autism are impaired in their ability to attribute mental states (such as beliefs, knowledge states, etc.) to themselves and other people". This is otherwise known as an impaired theory of mind (ToM). Baron-Cohen believed that a lack of ability to read eyes was a particularly important deficit, and developed a training program to develop this. It is now thought that all autistic people have some ToM ability. The book Mindblindness: An Essay on Autism and Theory of Mind was released in 1995.

In 1990, the BBC in the UK aired a documentary about one boy's treatment using the Son-Rise program, titled I Want My Little Boy Back, as part of the series Q.E.D.: Challenging Children.

In India, Action for Autism (AFA) began in 1991 as a parent support group. It soon became India's foremost autism organisation.

Hans Asperger's early papers were first published in English in 1991, as part of the book Autism and Asperger Syndrome. They were translated by the book's editor, Uta Frith. This further increased awareness of Asperger's work, and of the concept of "Asperger syndrome".

In Turkey, a support group for parents of children with autism began in 1991. It reformed as the Turkish Autistic Support and Education Foundation  (TODEV) in 1997. It is Turkey's pre-eminent autism group. 

 1992-1993 
Researchers Giacomo Rizzolatti, Giuseppe Di Pellegrino, Luciano Fadiga, Leonardo Fogassi, and Vittorio Gallese at the University of Parma published a paper announcing the existence of mirror neurons in 1992. They found that when a monkey watches another monkey doing something, specialised neurons in the first monkey's brain fire in a way that mirrors the firing of the neurons in the acting monkey. The same scientists later found the same thing in human brains. It has been proposed that differences in the mirror neuron system is an important difference between people with and without autism, though the connection is currently considered tentative.

Personal memoir Nobody Nowhere: The Extraordinary Autobiography of an Autistic Girl by Australian Donna Williams was published in 1992, and was on the New York Times Bestsellers list in 1993.

American Jim Sinclair is credited as the first person to communicate the "anti-cure" or "autism rights" perspective in the late 1980s. In 1992, Sinclair co-founded the Autism Network International (ANI) with Kathy Grant and Donna Williams. ANI is an organization that publishes newsletters "written by and for autistic people". This grew into the autism rights movement.

Leadership of the TEACCH Autism Program passed from Eric Schopler to American psychologist Gary Mesibov in 1992. (Mesibov would subsequently follow Schopler as editor of the Journal of Autism and Developmental Disorders from 1997 to 2007).

The ICD-10 was first published in 1992, for use beginning in 1994. It made a number of changes to its categorisation of autism-related conditions. It newly included "Asperger syndrome" (F84.5) - its first recognition by a major mental health body. It also included "childhood autism" (F84.0), and a category for "atypical autism" (F84.1, similar to the DSM's PDD-NOS). The ICD-10 categorised all of these as "pervasive developmental disorders", as the DSM had done since 1980. The ICD childhood shyness conditions were incorporated into the new section "disorders of social functioning with onset specific to childhood and adolescence", with categories for elective mutism (F94.0) and various categories not specifically aligning with common autism symptoms. "Schizoid personality disorder" would remain, though its subcategories would not. (The ICD-9 would continue to be used for coding by some organisations in the United States until 2015.)

Stars and Rain was the first non-governmental organization established for autism in China. It was founded in March 1993 by Tian Huiping (田慧萍), a mother of a child with autism. The institution runs training programs for both parents and children, and overall has a focus on ABA.

 DSM-IV, autistic disorder, Asperger syndrome and other conditions (1994-2013) 

 1994-1999 
In 1994, reflecting the better understood diversity of autistic experience, the DSM-IV included a number of newly defined PDD conditions. "Autistic disorder" was redefined, and supplemented with the new conditions Asperger syndrome, Rett syndrome and childhood disintegrative disorder (CDD). PDD-NOS remained. The definition of Asperger syndrome required those with it to have speech and language difficulties.

Schizoid personality disorder and avoidant personality disorder also remained. "Elective mutism" became "selective mutism".

American psychiatrist Fred Volkmar was the lead author of the autism section. (From 2007, Volkmar would later be the fourth editor of the Journal of Autism and Developmental Disorders).

The nation-wide  (Autism Spain) was established in Spain in January 1994 by the coming together of autonomous community based organisations.

The Korean Autism Society (한국자폐학회)  was founded in South Korea in 1994. It has focused on professionals who treat those with the condition.

The US National Alliance for Autism Research was founded in 1994. (It merged with Autism Speaks in early 2006).

An updated and expanded Son-Rise book, Son-Rise: The Miracle Continues was released in 1994.

American speech therapist Michelle Garcia Winner began to develop the Social Thinking Methodology in the mid-1990s, and established the Social Thinking company shortly afterwards. The organisation has subsequently developed a wide range of resources for teaching social skills to people with autism. Winner's works were a substantial influence on Ontario autism support workers in 2011.American animal behaviourist Temple Grandin came to prominence in 1996, with the publishing of her popular book Thinking in Pictures: My Life with Autism in November 1995. She would later become a board member of the Autism Society of America.

Simon Baron-Cohen and others developed a test for autism for 18-month-olds, which was published in February 1996.

In September 1996, British child psychiatrist Sula Wolff finding translating and publishing Grunya Sukhareva's 1925 paper, starting the process of increasing awareness of Sukhareva's work in the West.

 (Indonesian Autism Foundation) was founded in by five doctors and eight parents of people with autism in 1997.

The scientific journal Autism was founded in 1997 by the British National Autistic Society.

American teacher Brenda Smith Myles at the University of Kansas began writing well-received books to help people with Asperger syndrome in the late 1990s. These books were also a substantial influence on Ontario autism support workers in 2011.

In February 1998, British doctor Andrew Wakefield published a controversial paper claiming a link between some vaccines and autism. It was subsequently found to be fraudulent.

The term "neurodiversity" was coined in 1998. Neurodiversity is the idea that people can think differently to the norm without those differences being a medical problem. Australian sociologist Judy Singer used it in her 1998 honours thesis Odd People In: The Birth of Community Amongst People on the Autistic Spectrum, (which was republished as the book Neurodiversity: The Birth of an Idea in September 2017). American self-advocate Jane Meyerdin used it in her essay Thoughts on Finding Myself Differently Brained in 1998. It was used by the group known as the "Institute for the Study of the Neurologically Typical" (INST). The term first appeared in print in the September 1998 article Neurodiviersity in The Atlantic, by American journalist Harvey Blume.

The influential book Asperger's Syndrome: A Guide for Parents and Professionals was published by British-Australian psychologist Tony Attwood in 1998. Attwood went on to publish widely on autistic topics. A survey of Ontario autism support workers in 2011 found that 52% had support programs influenced by him.

On November 21, 1998, the World Autism Organisation (WAO) began. It was set up by Autism-Europe to prompt the UN to do more about autism, and to increase autism support in countries with few services of that kind.

The 1998 Hollywood action movie Mercury Rising featured a boy with autism.

The developmental social-pragmatic (DSP) model of autism treatment emerged in the late 1990s. It aims to work with and strengthen autistic children's desires to successfully communicate (as well as their ability to), with parents and teachers conversing with children in as non-contrived ways as possible. It emphasises cognitive psychology more than typical, behaviourism focused, varieties of ABA.Pretending to Be Normal: Living with Asperger's Syndrome was an autobiography published by American researcher Liane Holliday Willey in 1999. She released an updated edition in 2014. (The book was praised by Sula Wolff). She went on to write a number of other books on autism topics. She has been said to have coined the term Aspie (for someone with Asperger syndrome) in 1999.

 2000-2004 
The DSM-IV TR (2000) contained an almost complete rewrite of the definition of Asperger syndrome. Notably, it now no longer included speech and language difficulties.

The United States' Interagency Autism Coordinating Committee was set up in 2000. It coordinates US government autism actions.

The term neurodivergent (referring to an individual who thinks differently to the norm), was coined in 2000 by American neurodiversity activist Kassiane Asasumasu.

In February 2001, the "Autistic Spectrum Quotient" measure of autism within an individual was released by a Simon Baron-Cohen-led team from the University of Cambridge.

In 2001, the autistic daughter of Israeli Major General Gabi Ophir inspired him and others to establish Special in Uniform, an organisation that supports a squad of teens with disabilities and/or autism in the Israel Defense Forces.

 (PAS, Persons on the Autism Spectrum) was founded in the Netherlands in 2001. It represents autistic people with normal or higher IQs.

There are certain specialised parts of the brain that non-autistic people use to process face information. American psychiatrist Karen Pierce and others found that autistic people don't use these parts of the brain for this task. They also found that the fusiform face area in individuals with autism has a reduced volume. They published a paper on these and related findings in October 2001.The Introvert Advantage: How to Thrive in an Extrovert World was a popular book released by American psychologist Marti Olsen Laney in February 2002.

Diagnostic tool the "Diagnostic Interview for Social and Communication Disorders" (DISCO) was released in March 2002 by Lorna Wing and others. It is used in the UK. It was a further development of the child-specific "Handicaps Behaviour and Skills" (HBS) schedule Wing had developed in the 1970s.

The empathising–systemising theory of autism was released by Simon Baron-Cohen in June 2002. He and others would go on to develop it in subsequent years.

Relationship Development Intervention was developed by American psychologist Steven Gutstein in the 1990s. It became better known after the publishing of books on the topic in 2002.

Fred Frankel and Robert Myatt developed the Children's Friendship Training (CFT) model over two decades at UCLA, publishing a book on it in 2002.

The book The Fear of Game Brain (ゲーム脳の恐怖) was released by Japanese physiologist Akio Mori in 2002, and sold over 100,000 copies in Japan. In a related speaking engagement, Mori was believed to say that autism is at least in part caused by people spending too much time playing video games. However, Mori refuted this assertion to Autism Society Japan.

August 2002 saw the publishing of Freaks, Geeks, and Asperger Syndrome: A User Guide to Adolescence by 13-year-old British adolescent with Asperger syndrome, Luke Jackson. The book was praised by Sula Wolff. In January 2004, Luke and his family featured in the BBC documentary feature My Family and Autism. In 2005, a fictional movie based on the family, Magnificent 7, was aired on the BBC. It included a character based on Luke's mother, fellow autistic subject author Jacqui Jackson.

The British fiction book The Curious Incident of the Dog in the Night-Time was published in May 2003 by Mark Haddon. It features a protagonist that the publishers have said has Asperger's syndrome, but was not specifically written that way. In 2012, it was made into a successful West End play, which then went to Broadway in 2014.

Autistic-specialist employment services company Specialisterne was founded by Danish IT worker Thorkil Sonne in 2003. It has gone on to operate in various parts of Europe, North America and Australia.

In July 2003, British child psychologist Elizabeth Newson at the University of Nottingham published an article in the Archives of Disease in Childhood journal arguing that pathological demand avoidance (PDA) be recognised as a unique profile within the autism spectrum. She had first seen the pattern of PDA in children in 1980. She believed that autistic people with pronounced PDA symptoms tend to behave quite differently to those that don't.

The Social Communication Questionnaire (SCQ) is a commonly used tool for measuring autism social symptoms. It was released as the Autism Screening Questionnaire (ASQ), by British psychiatrists Michael Rutter and Anthony Bailey, and American psychologist Catherine Lord, in 2003.

 2005–2009 
American advocacy organisation Autism Speaks was founded in 2005 by businessman Bob Wright and his wife Suzanne Wright, grandparents of a child with autism. In 2023, the organisation claimed it had so far provided more than 18 million people with free autism information and resources.Mozart and the Whale, an American romantic comedy-drama film about two people with Asperger's syndrome, was first released in September 2005. It was based on a true story.

 (한국자폐인사랑협회는) was founded in South Korea in January 2006. It has focused on representing people with autism and their parents.

Israeli people-with-autism representative organisation  began in early 2006.

Simon Baron-Cohen and others released an animated series for autistic pre-schoolers called The Transporters in 2006. Its creators claimed that autistic children could learn to read facial emotions as well as non-autistic children after repeated viewing. The series was nominated for a BAFTA. The British-voiced version of the series is available for free under a Creative Commons licence.

The documentary feature Normal People Scare Me: A Film About Autism was produced by American actor Joey Travolta in 2006.The SCERTS Model: A Comprehensive Educational Approach for Children with Autism Spectrum Disorders was published in 2006 by five American authors. The model continues to be developed.

China's Eleventh Five Year Development Programme for the Disabled (中国残疾人事业"十一五"发展纲要) was released in 2006. It officially recognised autism as a neurological disability.

The Simons Foundation established the Simons Foundation Autism Research Initiative (SFARI) in 2006. As of 2023, the foundation has a research budget of over US$100 million per year.

In October 2006, N. Carolyn Schanen (of the University of Delaware), found two chromosomes with a strong epigenetic association with autism.

The Autistic Self Advocacy Network (ASAN) was co-founded in November 2006 by Americans Ari Ne'eman and Scott Michael Robertson. It has positioned itself as America's foremost body of autistic people representing the interests of autistic people. Affiliated bodies were later formed in Australia and New Zealand, Canada and Portugal.

The Academic Autistic Spectrum Partnership In Research and Education (AASPIRE) was also founded in the United States in 2006. It focuses on improving the lives of autistic adults. It has come to work closely with ASAN.

The United States passed it's Combating Autism Act in December 2006, providing US$1 billion for autism services and research in that country, over five years.

World Autism Awareness Day was first held by the United Nations in April 2007. Lighting buildings with blue light at night is a common means of awareness raising on this day. Autism Speaks has embraced it.

The character Sheldon Cooper first appeared on American television in September 2007, in the popular sitcom The Big Bang Theory. While he is not explicitly autistic, according to the actor who plays him as an adult, the character "couldn't display more traits" of Asperger's syndrome. Specific video is Jim Parsons interview, part 5 . Question is from 03:18–3:31. Answer is from 4:36–6:00. Specific quote is from 5:15–5:20.

2007 also saw the publishing of The Reason I Jump, a popular memoir attributed to Naoki Higashida, a Japanese 13-year-old boy with autism. It was released in English in 2013, and has been translated into over 30 languages.

Another popular book of 2007 was Look Me in the Eye: My Life with Asperger's by American John Elder Robison, first released in September that year. Robison would later become a board member of Autism Speaks.

The UK's Autism Education Trust was established by the National Autistic Society and the UK's Department for Children, Schools and Families in 2007. It is tasked with ensuring that all British children with autism are educated appropriately, through better education of their teachers.Children of the Stars (来自星星的孩子) is a 2007 documentary about lives of autistic children in China.

The scientific journal Research in Autism Spectrum Disorders was founded in 2007 by Elsevier.

In February 2008, American psychiatrist Riva Ariella Ritvo of Yale University and others released the Ritvo Autism and Asperger Diagnostic Scale (RAADS). A revised version, RAADS-R, was released in 2011.

The notable book No More Meltdowns was published by American Jed Baker in April 2008. This and his other works were substantially influential on Ontario autism support workers in 2011.

The imprinted brain hypothesis of autism was first presented by Bernard Crespi and Christopher Badcock of Canada's Simon Fraser University in June 2008.

The SFARI website launched a "News & Opinion" section in 2008. This grew, and was given its own identity as Spectrum in 2015. This has become an important autism research news website.Autism Spectrum News began as a quarterly print publication in the United States in 2008. It became online-only in 2021.

The US state of South Carolina enacted Ryan's Law in July 2008. This requires health insurers to provide up to $50,000 of behavioral therapy each year for people with autism aged 16 and younger.

The Autism Science Foundation was founded in the United States in April 2009, by Alison Singer and Karen Margulis London. It's founders broke away from Autism Speaks due to it's focus on funding research into possible links between vaccines and autism.

The soap opera Aapki Antara first went on air in India in June 2009. The title character of the series is a girl with autism.

 2010-2013 
The ASEAN Autism Network was created in January 2010, linking together autism organisations in South East Asia. It held the ASEAN Autism Games athletic competition in 2016 and 2018.

A movie about, and named after prominent autistic person Temple Grandin was released in February 2010.

The Program for the Education and Enrichment of Relational Skills (PEERS) was developed by Americans Elizabeth Laugeson and Fred Frankel in 2010, drawing on Frankel's earlier CFT work. Laugeson later established the UCLA PEERS Clinic. PEERS programs are used to teach social skills to autistic and other people in many countries of the world.Aspergirls: Empowering Females with Asperger Syndrome was published by American writer Rudy Simone in 2010. She went on to write a number of other books on autistic subjects.Ocean Heaven (海洋天堂) is a June 2010 Chinese dramatic feature film about a single father trying to teach his adult son with autism how to survive without him.

The book, A History of Autism: Conversations with the Pioneers, was published by British autism writer Adam Feinstein in June 2010.

In 2010, Andrew Wakefield retracted his paper claiming a link between autism and vaccines, and subsequently lost his licence to practice medicine.

The open access scientific journal Molecular Autism was founded in the UK by BioMed Central in 2010.

The first edition of Revista Autismo (Autism Magazine) was published in Brazil in September 2010.

Israeli TV drama פלפלים הובים (Yellow Peppers) first aired in December 2010. It featured a family caring for an autistic child. It won Israel's best TV drama award. A British version, The A Word, first aired in 2016. Greek and Dutch versions have also been made. An American version is currently in production.

Emotional control guidebook Zones of Regulation was published by American occupational therapist Leah Kuypers in 2011, to help people with autism and others who needed it. It has since sold over 100,000 copies. Various other products helping people understand and use the Zones concept have since been created.

Bestselling book Quiet: The Power of Introverts in a World That Can't Stop Talking was published by American writer Susan Cain in January 2012.

American TV series Touch first went on air in January 2012. It is a drama centring on a single father with an autistic son.The Asperkids' (Secret) Book of Social Rules: The Handbook of Not-So-Obvious Guidelines for Teens and Tweens was published by American social worker Jennifer Cook O'Toole in September 2012. It would win the Autism Society of America's Temple Grandin Outstanding Literary Work of the Year. Jennifer would go on to write a number of other books about autism.

The five volume Encyclopedia of Autism Spectrum Disorders was also first published in September 2012. Fred Volkmar was the editor-in-chief. A second edition was published in 2021.

The concept of the double empathy problem was first described as such in October 2012 by British psychologist Damian Milton. The idea proposes that the interaction issues between autistic and non-autistic people are at least in part because these two types of people think differently from each other, understand other people in their own group, but have difficulty understanding people that think differently. This contrasts with the idea that the interaction issues are due to autistic people having lesser social understanding abilities than non-autistic people.

In December 2012, Brazil passed the Berenice Piana Law, which created the National Policy for the Protection of the Rights of Persons with Autism Spectrum Disorder. This officially classified autism as a disability under Brazilian law, and increased the condition's profile in the country.

The Australian government established its national autism research organisation Autism CRC in March 2013.

 DSM-5 and autistic spectrum disorder (2013-today) 

 2013-2017 
In May 2013, the DSM-5 was released. It combined "autistic disorder", "Asperger's syndrome", "CDD" and "PDD-NOS" into the broader concept of "autism spectrum disorder" (ASD), and discontinued the four earlier conditions. It also grouped the symptoms into two groups - impaired social communication and/or interaction, and restricted and/or repetitive behaviors. The new definition was narrower than the collective definitions of its DSM-IV predecessors had been, reducing the number of neurodiverse people covered by it.

The DSM-5 assigned three "severity levels" for ASD, with people in level 1 "requiring support", level 2 "requiring substantial support" and level 3 "requiring very substantial support". Many autism activists believe the autistic spectrum should not be measured in this way, as it doesn't take into account the greatly varying attributes the people in the different severity levels have.

DSM publishers, the American Psychiatric Association, said that "The revised diagnosis represents a new, more accurate, and medically and scientifically useful way of diagnosing individuals with autism-related disorders." It also noted that the conditions that the new ASD condition replaced "were not consistently applied across different clinics and treatment centers".

"Schizoid personality disorder", "avoidant personality disorder" and "selective mutism" remained.

The Iran Autism Association was founded in 2013 by treatment professionals, the autistic and their families.

Diagnostic test, the "Aspie Quiz", was released by Leif Ekblad of Sweden in July 2013.

The TV series Good Doctor (굿 닥터), featuring an autistic doctor, began on South Korean TV in August 2013. (An American version would first air in 2017, and a Japanese one in 2018).

In the UK, April 2014 saw the BBC broadcast an episode of Horizon entitled Living with Autism, featuring Uta Frith.

The United States government passed the Autism CARES Act of 2014, authorising the spending of US$1.3 billion between 2015 and 2019. This extended the work of the Combating Autism Act. The Act was reauthorised in 2019.

Autism Speaks, Hospital for Sick Children (Toronto) and Google Genomics began the AUT10K project in 2014. It created one of the world's largest collections of autism related genetic material, and had open access to researchers, called AGRE. The project later evolved into the similar MSSNG project. MSSNG aims to "provide the best resources to enable the identification of many subtypes of autism".

The American feature documentary Autism in Love was also released in cinemas in April 2015, and later aired in the US on PBS in 2016.

In 2015, representative body Autism Canada was created through the merger of Autism Society Canada and Autism Canada Foundation.

Brazilian researcher Alysson Muotri and others founded the company Tismoo in 2015, which aims to develop genetic treatments for autism and other conditions.

Bestselling book NeuroTribes: The Legacy of Autism and the Future of Neurodiversity was published by American writer Steve Silberman in August 2015. It did much to spread the concept of neurodiversity.

The Accountant was a 2016 American feature film, starring Ben Affleck as an autistic accountant.

The book In a Different Key: The Story of Autism by John Donvan and Caren Zucker was released in 2016. The authors found and interviewed the patient Leo Kanner first recognised as having autism, Donald Triplett. It was nominated for the 2017 Pulitzer Prize for General Nonfiction.

2016 saw Australia's main state-based and other autism representative organisations group together as the Australian Autism Alliance.

In March 2017, the Russian peak parents-of-autistic-children representative body Autism Regions (Аутизм Регионы) was founded.

Neurodiversity employment services organisation Untapped Group was co-founded by Australian accountant Andrew Eddy in 2017. It operates in the United States and Australia, and notably organises the prominent Autism at Work conferences.

Two substantive autistic characters featured on American television from 2017. The title character of new program The Good Doctor was a young man with autism. Also, a four-year-old autistic girl Muppet named Julia joined the main Sesame Street show, with the assistance of ASAN. These programs subsequently circulated elsewhere.

American TV series Atypical, which centres on a teenage boy on the autism spectrum, was first released in August 2017.Quiet Girl in a Noisy World: An Introvert's Story was a popular book released by British cartoonist Debbie Tung in November 2017. It details a few years of the author's life as she learns she is introverted, and how she found her place in the world.

 2018-today 
Australian factual TV series You Can't Ask That about different groups of unusual people began in 2016, and as of 2023 was subsequently remade in 11 other territories. The Israeli version broadcast an episode about people on the autistic spectrum in 2018. The Canadian version followed in 2019, and the Australian one did likewise in 2020. An American version of the series is currently in production.

Israeli comedy-drama על הספקטרום (On the Spectrum) first aired in May 2018. It won Israel's best drama award. An American version, As We See It, was first released in 2022.A National Guideline for the Assessment and Diagnosis of Autism Spectrum Disorders in Australia was released by Autism CRC in August 2018.

In the United States, the National Council on Severe Autism was founded in January 2019. It is concerned with autistic people who have an IQ of 85 or less.

The Camouflaging Autistic Traits Questionnaire (CAT-Q) was released by Laura Hull, Simon Baron-Cohen and others in March 2019.Sorry I'm Late, I Didn't Want to Come: An Introvert's Year of Living Dangerously was a popular book written by American psychologist and journalist Jessica Pan, and released in May 2019. It describes how the author spent a year fighting her introversion and succeeding.

Australian documentary TV series Love on the Spectrum first aired in November 2019. An American version, which featured Jennifer Cook, was launched in 2022.

The book Our autistic lives: personal accounts from autistic adults aged 20 to 70+ was compiled by British autism writer Alex Ratcliffe, and was released in January 2020.

Australia's National Disability Insurance Scheme went into full operation in 2020. It provides many autistic people in that country with substantial amounts of money to help them live fuller lives.

In April 2021, the American Autism Awareness Month became Autism Acceptance Month.

In the UK, the BBC broadcast the documentary Paddy And Christine McGuinness: Our Family And Autism in December 2021.

January 2022 saw the first use of the ICD-11. This version of the ICD combined all PDD conditions as "autistic spectrum disorder" (following the DSM's practice). However, unlike the DSM-5, the ICD-11 included a number of ASD subdivisions, including "Autism spectrum disorder without disorder of intellectual development and with mild or no impairment of functional language" (6A02.0), an equivalent to "Asperger syndrome". The ICD-11 included much more detailed descriptions of conditions than its predecessors, including that for ASD.Unmasking Autism: Discovering the New Faces of Neurodiversity was a popular book written by American psychologist Devon Price, and published in April 2022.Extraordinary Attorney Woo is a South Korean TV series about an autistic woman that first aired in June 2022.

American psychiatrist Lynn Kern Koegel of Stanford University became the sixth editor of the Journal of Autism and Developmental Disorders in 2022. She and her husband had earlier developed pivotal response treatment.

The National Guideline for Supporting the Learning, Participation, and Wellbeing of Autistic Children and Their Families in Australia'' was released by Autism CRC in February 2023.

Autistic individuals bypass nonverbal cues and emotional sharing that they find difficult to deal with, and has given them a way to form online communities and work remotely. Societal and cultural aspects of autism have developed: some in the community seek a cure, while others believe that autism is simply another way of being.

Although the rise of parent organizations and the destigmatization of childhood ASD have affected how ASD is viewed, parents continue to feel social stigma in situations where their child's autistic behavior is perceived negatively, and many primary care physicians and medical specialists express beliefs consistent with outdated autism research.

The discussion of autism has brought about much controversy. Without researchers being able to meet a consensus on the varying forms of condition, there was for a time a lack of research being conducted on the disorder. Discussing the syndrome and its complexity frustrated researchers. Controversies have surrounded various claims regarding the etiology of autism.

References

Autism